Lower Marshes is a rural locality in the local government areas (LGA) of Central Highlands and Southern Midlands in the Central LGA region of Tasmania. The 2016 census recorded a population of 9 for the state suburb of Lower Marshes.

History 
Lower Marshes was gazetted as a locality in 1974. It was previously known as Rutland and as Pooles Marsh.

Geography
The Exe Rivulet forms the north-eastern boundary. The Jordan River flows through from east to south-west.

Road infrastructure 
Route C529 (Lower Marshes Road) runs through from south-east to south-west.

References

Towns in Tasmania
Localities of Central Highlands Council
Localities of Southern Midlands Council